For the Rogers Building in Toronto Canada see, Rogers Building (Canada)

The Rogers Building (also known as the English Club) is a historic site in Orlando, Florida. It is located at 37-39 South Magnolia Avenue. Originally an English Gentlemen's Club built in the Queen Anne style, is the oldest building in downtown Orlando and now is home the Downtown Art's District. 

The Downtown Arts District provides funding support, manages and operates CityArts -- a multi-use arts and cultural destination where visual and performing arts co-exist inside the Roger's Building. Visited by more than 100,000 people annually, CityArts showcases an infusion of local and international works of art, and is home to six independently operated art galleries as well as art collective, Red Tape. 

On July 7, 1983, it was added to the U.S. National Register of Historic Places.

References

External links
 Orange County listings at Florida's Office of Cultural and Historical Programs

Gallery

Buildings and structures in Orlando, Florida
History of Orlando, Florida
National Register of Historic Places in Orange County, Florida
Victorian architecture in Florida